Alloclita brachygrapta is a moth in the family Cosmopterigidae. It is found in the Egypt (the Sinai Peninsula). The species was described on the basis of two males in the collection of the Natural History Museum in London.

Adults have been recorded in September.

References

Moths described in 1925
Antequerinae
Endemic fauna of Egypt
Moths of Africa